Linda Spa (aka Mag. Gerlinde Spazierer, born 4 September 1968, in Vienna) is an Austrian composer.

Originally she learned fashion design in Vienna, but soon started with her musical training. She studied flute, clarinet, saxophone and composition. In addition, Linda Spa is a trained conductor and arranger.

In addition to many international artistic works, especially for theater and film music scores, actually in Austria in the field of stage- and acting music, she played for many years with Edgar Froese's band Tangerine Dream as saxophonist, keyboardist and conductor.  She also composed for this ensemble, and also toured occasionally with the band in Europe and overseas till 2015.

Linda Spa was Grammy nominated five times as a leading member of the band Tangerine Dream in the 1990s.
She performed live the song Sally's Garden 2011 together with Queen guitar player Brian May as a duet on stage.

For some time, Linda Spa has been working with various guest musicians on the completion of her new CD with love songs composed by her.

Discography

with Tangerine Dream
Major albums
 1992: 220 Volt Live (Live)
 1994: Turn of the Tides
 1995: Tyranny of Beauty
 1996: Goblins' Club
 2005: Jeanne d'Arc
 2007: Madcap's Flaming Duty
 2010: Under Cover
 2011: The Island of the Fay

References

External links
 Official website of the artist
 Tangerine Dream Web for more details

1968 births
Living people
Austrian women composers
Austrian composers
Tangerine Dream members